Mount Abao is a mountain in the Philippines.

References

Mountains of the Philippines
Landforms of Mountain Province